Sphenomorphus murudensis  is a species of skink found in Indonesia and Malaysia.

References

murudensis
Reptiles described in 1925
Taxa named by Malcolm Arthur Smith
Reptiles of Borneo